Chamaetrichon is a genus of green algae in the family Gayraliaceae.

References

External links

Ulvophyceae genera
Ulotrichales